Golabi may refer to:
 Golabi-ye Olya, Chaharmahal and Bakhtiari Province
 Golabi-ye Sofla, Chaharmahal and Bakhtiari Province
 Golabi, Hormozgan